Mehmet Reha Eken (1 January 1925 – 19 August 2013) was a Turkish professional footballer who played as a forward. He was strongly associated with Galatasaray Istanbul because of his long career at the club. On fan club pages he is regarded as one of the greatest players in the club's history. In his four stakes for the Turkish national team, he scored six goals and has with 1.5 the best goal / game ratio of any Turkish national team player. He was also part of Turkey's squad for the football tournament at the 1948 Summer Olympics, but he did not play in any matches.

His two brothers Danyal Vuran and Bülent Eken were also active as players at Galatasaray.

Death
Eken died on 19 August 2013 in Istanbul at the age of 88.

References

1925 births
2013 deaths
Turkish footballers
Turkish football managers
Footballers from Istanbul
Association football forwards
Galatasaray S.K. footballers
Turkey international footballers
Karşıyaka S.K. managers
Göztepe S.K. managers